The Syracuse Orange women represented Syracuse University in CHA women's ice hockey during the 2017-18 NCAA Division I women's ice hockey season.

Offseason

Recruiting

Standings

Roster

2017–18 Orange

2017-18 Schedule

|-
!colspan=12 style="background:#0a2351; "| Regular Season

|-
!colspan=12 style="background:#0a2351; "| CHA Tournament

Awards and honors

References

Syracuse
Syracuse Orange women's ice hockey seasons
Syracuse ice hockey
Syracuse ice hockey